L'Adunata dei refrattari (en: Call of the refractaires (unmanageable ones)) was an Italian American anarchist publication published between 1922 and 1971 in New York City. It was first edited by Osvaldo Maraviglia and later by Max Sartin (Raffaele Schiavina). It was illegally distributed in Italy during its fascist period. The theoretical line tended towards the tradition of Italian insurrectionary anti-organizationalism through the influence of Luigi Galleani who wrote for this publication. The editors of L' Adunata dei refrattari published a collection of Galleani's essays as a book called The End of Anarchism?.

References

1922 establishments in New York City
1971 disestablishments in New York (state)
Anarchism in New York (state)
Anarchist periodicals published in the United States
Defunct political magazines published in the United States
Insurrectionary anarchism
Italian-American history
Italian-American culture in New York City
Italian-language magazines
Magazines established in 1922
Magazines disestablished in 1971
Magazines published in New York City